The 1992 Washington Huskies football team was an American football team that represented the University of Washington during the 1992 NCAA Division I-A football season.  In its eighteenth and final season under head coach Don James, the defending national champion Huskies won their first eight games and took the Pacific-10 Conference title for the third consecutive season.

Attempting to win a third straight Rose Bowl, the Huskies lost to Michigan by seven points and finished with a 9–3 record. Washington outscored its opponents 337 to 186.

Dave Hoffmann was selected as the team's most valuable player. Hoffmann, Mark Brunell, Lincoln Kennedy, and Shane Pahukoa were the team captains.

Schedule

Roster

Game summaries

Nebraska

The Nebraska game on September 19 was the first night game at Husky Stadium and Washington's seventeenth consecutive win. During the game, ESPN measured the noise level at over 130 decibels, well above the threshold of pain. The peak recorded level of 133.6 decibels is the highest ever recorded at a college football stadium.

vs. Michigan (Rose Bowl)

NFL Draft selections
The following Washington players were selected in the 1993 NFL Draft:

 This draft was eight rounds, with 224 selections

Source:

References

Washington
Washington Huskies football seasons
Pac-12 Conference football champion seasons
Washington Huskies football